The four-toed salamander (Hemidactylium scutatum) is a lungless salamander native to eastern North America. It is the only species of the monotypic genus Hemidactylium.

Description

The four-toed salamander can be recognized by its white underbelly sprinkled with black dots. Its back varies from orange-brownish to red-brownish; its flanks are grayish. The body and the limbs are elongated. The snout is short, and the eyes are prominent. The tail color is usually brighter than the back, and you can observe a constriction at the body/tail junction. The posterior limbs have four toes (hence its name), a good identification criterion but hard to use in the field. This species rarely exceeds  in length. The sexes are alike except for the shape of the head. Males have elongated and almost square snouts, whereas the females' snouts are short and round. The juveniles show a tail shorter than the body.

The four-toed salamander can be easily mistaken for the redback salamander (Plethodon cinereus) in the wild. The Four-toed salamander's underbelly is more of a "salt and pepper" color. There is no constriction at the tail, and posterior limbs show five digits.

Reproduction
Mating occurs in terrestrial areas throughout the autumn months. In early spring the females nest on land, along the banks of small ponds. After the 4–6 week embryonic period, the larvae hatch and make their way to the adjacent pond. Four-toed salamanders undergo a relatively short aquatic larval period, when compared to other species of the same family, ranging between 3 and 6 weeks.

Self defense
The four-toed salamander has three main forms of self-defense against predators. The first is that it purposely sheds off its tail to distract the enemy. When the tail comes off, it is still wiggling around. The enemy gets distracted, giving the salamander time to get away. The second form of defense is playing dead. When threatened, this salamander will have a short burst of violent thrashes and then stop dead in its tracks. It will stay frozen like this until it feels the threat is gone (Sass and Anderson, 2011). The third and final form of defense is curling up and putting its tail on its back, offering it in exchange for its life.

Nesting behavior
There are three methods of nesting that have been documented in the females of H. scutatum, which can fall into one of two categories: solitary or communal/joint nesting. Solitary nesters lay and brood only their eggs. Communal nesting is normally one female brooding the eggs of two or more, up to 14, females of the same species. In this method the females either lay their eggs and leave the nest, or lay their eggs and stay to brood their eggs as well as those of the deserting females. About one-third of the nests of a population are joint nests, while between 50% and 70% of females lay their eggs in joint nests each year.

Oophagy has also been reported in H.scutatum, where one female would eat several eggs of another female before laying her eggs in a communal nest.

Habitat

This species' favored habitats are sphagnum bogs, grassy areas surrounding beaver ponds, and deciduous or mixed forests rich with mosses. The four-toed salamander will use the sphagnum bogs during reproduction, but uses the forest habitat during the summer. It overwinters in terrestrial habitat, using old burrows or cavities created by rotting roots, below the freezing depth. It will frequently overwinter in groups, sometimes with other amphibians such as the red-backed salamander.

In Canada, the four-toed salamander can be found in southern Ontario and Quebec, in Nova Scotia, and a single population was found in New Brunswick in 1983. In the United States, it can be found from Maine to Minnesota and as far as Alabama in the south. They have also been found in eastern Kentucky.

The home range of the species is not known. It was believed that the different elements of its habitat (breeding, summer and overwintering) had to be within 100 m of each other, but recent observations might suggest this to be an underestimation.

Diet
Four-toed salamanders feed mostly on small invertebrates, such as spiders, worms, ticks, springtails (collembola), ground beetles (Carabidae), and other insects. Larvae love small aquatic crustaceans.

Predation
Larvae are eaten by other salamanders (adults and larvae), fish, and aquatic beetles. Shrews, snakes, and some ground beetles feast on this species. When it feels threatened, H. scutatum will use autotomy (drops its tail, still wiggling) to distract the attention of predators.

Conservation status
Although it is rare, or at least rarely seen in Canada, Committee on the Status of Endangered Wildlife in Canada (COSEWIC) does not consider H. scutatum to be at risk. It is also listed as a species of least concern by the International Union for Conversation of Nature (IUCN) due to the wide distribution and assumed large population. But it is at risk in some provinces such as in Quebec (S3 Rare in the province; usually between 20 and 100 occurrences in the province; may have fewer occurrences, but with a large number of individuals in some populations; may be susceptible to large-scale disturbances). Its status in the United States ranges from Threatened (Illinois), to Endangered (Minnesota), to Special Concern (Wisconsin, Ohio, and Missouri).

References

External links
 
 
 Tree of Life: Hemidactylium scutatum
 Four-toed Salamander (Plethodon cinereus), Natural Resources Canada

Plethodontidae
Amphibians of Canada
Amphibians of the United States
Fauna of the Great Lakes region (North America)
Fauna of the Northeastern United States
Fauna of the Southeastern United States
Ecology of the Appalachian Mountains
Amphibians described in 1838